The Estonian Grand Prix was a motor race. Mostly held for motorcycles, three times it was held for cars in the period between the World Wars. The race was established on a road course held between the villages of Pirita and Kose, near Tallinn.

The race was established in 1933 and in 1934 it was first held for cars. In 1935 a collection of Grand Prix style machinery with the race being won by regular Grand Prix racer, Karl Ebb in a Mercedes-Benz SSK ahead of the Bugatti Type 35 of Emil Elo and Asser Wallenius driving a Ford V8 roadster. The poorly attended 1936 race was won by Aleksi Patama but after that the race reverted purely to motorcycle racing.

Winners of the Estonian Grand Prix

References 

Pre-World Championship Grands Prix
National Grands Prix
Defunct sports competitions in Estonia
Sports competitions in Tallinn
Motorsport competitions in Estonia
Recurring sporting events established in 1934
1936 disestablishments in Estonia
1934 in Estonian sport
1935 in Estonian sport
1936 in Estonian sport
1934 establishments in Estonia
Recurring events disestablished in 1936